Family caregivers (also known as “family carers”) are “relatives, friends, or neighbors who provide assistance related to an underlying physical or mental disability for at-home care delivery and assist in the activities of daily living (ADLs) who are unpaid and have no formal training to provide those services.”

A recent study says that 26.5% of all American adults today are family caregivers. A 2012 report by the Alzheimer’s Association states that 15 million of those family caregivers are caring for a person with Alzheimer’s disease or another dementia. The value of the voluntary, "unpaid" caregiving service provided by caregivers was estimated at $310 billion in 2006 — almost twice as much as was actually spent on home care and nursing services combined. By 2009, about 61.6 million caregivers were providing "unpaid" care at a value that had increased to an estimated $450 billion. It is projected that nearly one in five United States citizens will be 65 years of age or older by the year 2030. By 2050 this older population is expected to double in size.

Family caregiver experience
A 2011 survey of family caregivers in the United States found that almost half (46%) take on tasks that are traditionally considered “nursing” or “medical,” such as injections, wound care, and operating medical equipment and monitors. While the family caregivers’ assumption of such responsibilities is not new, the frequency may have increased over time due to shorter hospital stays, adults living longer with significant ailments, and technological and health care improvements allowing more nursing or medical care to be provided at home. This trend has implications for families, patients, family caregivers’ workplaces, health care organizations, and insurers, including Medicare and Medicaid. A survey by AARP in 2010 states that "29% of the U.S. adult population, or 65.7 million people, are caregivers, including 31% of all households. These caregivers provide an average of 20 hours of care per week."

1.4 million children ages 8 to 18 provide care for an adult relative; 72% are caring for a parent or grandparent. Fortunately, most are not the sole caregiver. 30% of family caregivers caring for seniors are themselves aged 65 or over; another 15% are between the ages of 45 to 54.

Caregiver gain
As discussed above, there are benefits to the caregiving experience. New research even reports gains in cognitive function in older women who provide informal (unpaid) care on a continuing basis. This cross-sectional study tested over 900 participants at baseline and again after two years for memory and processing speed, functions which are necessary for many caregiving tasks. The participants were divided into three groups, those who were caregivers over the entire two-year period, those who were caregivers at the start of the study but not at the two-year follow-up, and those who were not caregivers at any time during the research period. At follow-up, those who were caregivers throughout the study had the highest scores for both cognitive functions but also the highest reported levels of stress, while those participants who were not caregivers at any time during the study had the lowest scores for both cognitive functions and the lowest reported levels of stress. These results are consistent with the healthy caregiver hypothesis which states that while those older adults who are more likely to be caregivers are healthier to start with, it is the work of caregiving that helps keep them healthier than older adults who are not caregivers. This model contrasts with the long-held idea that the stress of caregiving results in poorer functioning over time.

In contrast, subsequent research has found that the benefit to family caregivers varies depending on the health of the person receiving care. Higher numbers of chronic conditions among those receiving care were associated with increased job stress, concern over making harmful errors, hypervigilance, feelings of depression, and feelings of suboptimal health among family caregivers. Nevertheless, family caregivers reported that they felt emotionally closer to the care recipient and that they were making a positive contribution to the care recipient’s life. In addition, training in medical and nursing tasks was found to have a protective effect for the family caregiver. Research has also found that most family caregivers said they had not received training about medication management from a professional, but rather had learned it on their own. In addition to this, optimism significantly mediated some of the relationship between angry reaction and vitality.

Taking care of the caregiver
One of the most common negative outcomes of being a caretaker is the infringement on time and activities. In most cases, this role becomes a full-time job in itself and does not leave much time for leisure activities the caregiver liked to participate in before becoming a primary caregiver. While this seems like an obvious outcome of caregiving, it is a critical cause of depression and if steps are not taken to intervene and provide the primary caretaker with adequate off time then they will quickly become not only depressed but resentful of their role as well  Other negative outcomes of being an informal primary caregiver can include an unfavorable relationship forming between the caregiver and receiver dyad as well as declines in both physical and mental health of the caregiver. wide variety of health issues that arise from being a primary caregiver. They reported that when caregivers were compared to equal non-caregivers, they were found to have a 15% lower level of antibody response and a 23% higher level of stress hormones in their bodies. This indicates the stress and strain placed upon primary caregivers can greatly impact their health and ability to recover from illness themselves. There are, however, strategies that caregivers and communities can use to reduce the effects of this added stress. Providing a type of respite care is the easiest intervention to reduce this negative outcome. It varies in forms, but the basic principle of respite care is to provide temporary care for a care recipient when their primary caregiver must be absent. It can be as informal as sitting with someone while the caregiver runs errands to a more formal setting such as an Adult Day Service or even overnight stay in an hospital or nursing home facility. Information, resources and support are often available through senior centers and local public health departments, but more research is needed to determine what services are helpful. Two studies that investigated the effectiveness of different interventions on the health of caregivers are described below.

The Resources for Enhancing Alzheimer's Caregiver Health (REACH) II intervention was a randomized clinical trial that provided self-care educational information and training on self-care skills, tailored to each caregiver's needs, to the intervention group, or a basic health information packet and two non-educational phone calls to the control group. Each intervention was designed to deal with a participant's personal issues using information provided by the caregiver at the beginning of the study, and researchers were personally involved during the 12 face-to-face and telephone sessions. At the end of the six-month study period, those receiving the intervention reported better physical and emotional health and less "burden and bother" with their caregiving duties than those in the control group.

Another study tested the effectiveness of three different interventions (a support group, provision of literature on self-care and caregiving, and creative movement) on five mental health variables of caregiving daughters of frail mothers. Each study participant chose the intervention that appealed to her most, rather than being randomly assigned to one. Study participants were then evaluated for self-reported irritability, depression, anxiety, stress, and concentration, and asked to assess the chosen intervention on an ongoing basis. Comparing the outcomes of the five variables, the support group's self-ratings suggested greater improvement than the literature group while the creative movement group was too small for a meaningful comparison. The participants' assessments of all three interventions were positive, with caregivers using words such as "validation," "reinforcement," and "relaxing." All study participants agreed that they would choose to participate again, and in the same intervention group. Those in the support group found the intervention so helpful that they continued to meet after the study's completion. For caregivers without the ability to join nearby support groups, online support groups such as a caregiver forum can offer similar benefits.

A different study has shown that family caregivers whose loved ones receive round the clock migrant home care services report greater satisfaction with the services, lower levels of burden, higher levels of subjective health and better well-being compared with home care services provided for only several hours per week. This is despite the fact that the group that relied on round the clock migrant home care workers had lower physical functioning.

It seems necessary to adapt treatments to caregivers’ specific characteristics (e.g. their limited availability of time and their bueden experience).

Signs of caregiver stress 
Caregiver stress is the emotional and physical strain of care giving. According to a UK-based study, almost two out of three carers of people with dementia feel lonely. Most of the carers in the study were family members of friends.

Avoiding caregiver burnout 
Caregiver stress explodes when the caregiver can't get much of a break - whether it is emotional or physical, a needed break is what makes it possible for the caregiver to function.

Tips for avoiding burnout are to know the signs and have a plan in place to combat the burnout. 
Some signs: 
Anger or annoyance at all kinds of things
Exhaustion
Nagging aches and pains
Over eating or Loss of appetite
Loss of interest in personal goals
Loss of joy in doing things once loved
Wanting to run away

Most caregiver stress can be avoided with a strategy to avoid it. 
Here are some tips: 
Enlist family members to pitch in 
Enlist a friend or a few friends
Create a care group so friends, family, or neighbors can coordinate to give the caregiver some respite
Think Outsourcing: Make a list of all the chores you don't want to do. Find a way to bring in help. If your family or friends can't or won't help, maybe a local church group, community respite organization. Ask on Facebook if anyone in your community knows someone—or ask a local email group. Think outside the box.
Find a local support group where you can meet people in person.
Find a Psychotherapeutic intervention.

Caregiving versus caretaking
In many dysfunctional groups, there is one person who ends up being the over responsible caretaker who gets their self-esteem from caring for other members. They do too much for others and not enough for themselves. What it means in recovery circles is that the person is doing for others what they can and should be doing for themselves. In the alcoholic work place, people cover for the worker who routinely misses deadlines, comes in late, or gets sick too often. In the alcoholic home, it's the person who cleans up, covers up, calls in sick for another person, or does everything they can to make the home life look normal when it isn't. That is unhealthy caretaking and a learned behavior.

In a caregiving home, the lines can be sometimes blurred. It may start slowly when the one needing care may need help after an illness or surgery. The caregiver finds it natural to help. The patient gets used to this help. The challenge for the caregiver is to know where to draw the line. Caregiver's are naturally giving and helpful people. Compassion is their core strength—but they run the risk of caretaking when they do too much for the person. There is a need for balancing caregiving when it is needed with caretaking where it is too much of one person feeling improperly responsible for duties that should be handled by the other person.

National Family Caregivers Month
The United States President proclaims the month of November as National Family Caregivers Month. On October 31, 2017, President Donald Trump proclaimed the month as National Family Caregivers Month.

See also
 Family Caregiver Alliance

References

External links
 National Family Caregivers Association
 Well Spouse Association
Senior Caregiver Info
 International Alliance of Carers Organizations 
 Canadian Caregiver Coalition 
 Carers Australia 
 Carers UK 
  Carers Ireland

Caregiving
Family